Makuti is a small village in Mashonaland West province, Zimbabwe. It lies on the main road between Harare and Chirundu borderpost. All traffic for Kariba turns off the Harare-Chirundu road at Makuti. The village is surrounded by wildlife/safari areas, and very few people live there. Makuti has a petrol station, a hotel, and a shop. The hotel's name is Clouds End, and it provides a scenic view of the Zimbabwean bush towards Lake Kariba. 
The name Makuti means "wet mist" or "persistent drizzle".

Populated places in Mashonaland West Province